Aneka Kerr (born 1 March 1981 in Rangiora) is a basketball player for New Zealand. At the 2006 Commonwealth Games she won a silver medal as part of the Tall Ferns New Zealand women's basketball team. Kerr represented New Zealand and the Tall Ferns at the 2004 and 2008 Summer Olympics.

Kerr also played in the Women's National Basketball League in Australia with teams from Melbourne, Townsville, Dandenong and Christchurch.

References

1981 births
Living people
New Zealand women's basketball players
Basketball players at the 2006 Commonwealth Games
Commonwealth Games silver medallists for New Zealand
Basketball players at the 2004 Summer Olympics
Basketball players at the 2008 Summer Olympics
People from Rangiora
Olympic basketball players of New Zealand
Commonwealth Games medallists in basketball
Sportspeople from Canterbury, New Zealand
Australian people of New Zealand descent
Medallists at the 2006 Commonwealth Games